The 1909 Chicago Maroons football team was an American football team that represented the University of Chicago during the 1909 college football season.  In their 18th season under head coach Amos Alonzo Stagg, the Maroons compiled a 4–1–2 record, finished in second place in the Western Conference with a 4–1–1 record against conference opponents, and outscored all opponents by a combined total of 134 to 40.

Schedule

Roster

Head coach: Amos Alonzo Stagg (18th year at Chicago)

References

Chicago
Chicago Maroons football seasons
Chicago Maroons football